Kushk-e Aqa Jan (also Romanized as Kūshk-e Āqā Jān and Keveshk-e Āqā Jān) is a village in Kushk Rural District, Abezhdan District, Andika County, Khuzestan Province, Iran. At the 2006 census, its population was 43, made up of 8 families.

References 

Populated places in Andika County